Chrisann Brennan (born September 29, 1954) is an American painter and memoirist. She is the author of The Bite in the Apple, an autobiography about her relationship with Apple co-founder Steve Jobs. They had one child, Lisa Brennan-Jobs.

Early life
Brennan was born in Dayton, Ohio, in 1954, one of four daughters of James Richard Brennan and Virginia Lavern Rickey. Chrisann was named after the flower chrysanthemum. Brennan notes in her memoir that she is "dyslexic, which has had the effect of making me differently wired, creative, and a voracious problem solver— bright, but more than slightly clueless to convention."

Her father worked for Sylvania and the family lived in a number of places including Colorado Springs and Nebraska. They eventually settled in Sunnyvale, California. Her parents divorced after their move to Buffalo, New York. Brennan attended Homestead High School in Cupertino, California, where she met Steve Jobs during the early months of 1972.

Relationship with Steve Jobs
Brennan and Jobs's relationship began in 1972 while they were students in high school together.  Brennan remained involved with Jobs while he was at Reed College. Brennan (who was then a senior at Homestead High School) did not have plans to attend college, and was supportive of Jobs when he told her he planned to drop out of Reed. He continued to attend by auditing classes, but Brennan stopped visiting him. Jobs later asked her to come and live with him in a house he rented near the Reed campus, but she refused. He had started seeing other women, and she was interested in someone she met in her art class. Brennan has speculated that the house was Jobs' attempt to make their relationship monogamous again.

In mid-1973, Jobs moved back to the San Francisco Bay Area. Brennan has stated that by this point their "relationship was complicated. I couldn't break the connection and I couldn't commit. Steve couldn't either." Jobs hitchhiked and worked around the West Coast and Brennan would occasionally join him. At the same time, Brennan noted, "little by little, Steve and I separated. But we were never able to fully let go. We never talked about breaking up or going our separate ways and we didn't have that conversation where one person says it's over." They continued to grow apart, but Jobs would still seek her out and visit her. They remained involved with each other while continuing to see other people.

By early 1974, Jobs was living what Brennan describes as a "simple life" in a Los Gatos cabin, working at Atari, and saving money for his impending trip to India. Brennan visited him twice at the cabin. Brennan's memories of this cabin consist of Jobs reading Be Here Now (and giving her a copy), listening to South Indian music, and using a Japanese meditation pillow. Brennan felt that he was more distant and negative towards her. Brennan states in her memoir that she met with Jobs right before he left for India and that he tried to give her $100 that he had earned at Atari. She initially refused it but eventually accepted the money.

After Brennan graduated from high school Jobs invited her to come and see him at the All One Farm, a commune in Oregon. While she did not spend much time with Jobs (who was recovering from an illness), Brennan was deeply influenced by the experience of meeting and working with the people that she met there.

In early 1975, Brennan became involved with a Zen Buddhist community in Los Altos, where she accidentally bumped into Jobs (whom she had not seen since the All One Farm). It was through this community that they would both meet and work with the Zen master Kobun. Jobs and Brennan began to spend more time together, although she noted that his behavior with her was more aloof than in the past. Brennan notes their lives were on different paths as she was deeply involved in her art program at Foothill College where she studied under Gordon Holler while Jobs was working with "Kobun and Woz." She also fell in love with Greg Calhoun (Jobs' former Reed classmate) who had come to visit from the All One Farm. Brennan moved to the All One Farm and lived for a while with Calhoun in a renovated chicken coop. They eventually moved back to the Bay Area to earn money for a trek to India. Jobs helped them find a home to rent, though he was opposed to their traveling together to India. After Brennan and Calhoun had earned enough money to go, Jobs drove them to the airport and gave them advice about how to survive in India. Brennan traveled for a year through India with Calhoun, though their relationship ended by the time she returned to the United States.

Apple (1977)
After her return from India, Brennan visited Jobs, whom she now considered just a friend, at his parents' home, where he was still living. It was during this period that Jobs and Brennan fell in love again, as Brennan noted changes in him that she attributes to Kōbun Chino Otogawa, whom she was also still following. It was also at this time that Jobs displayed a prototype Apple computer for Brennan and his parents in their living room. Brennan notes a shift in this time period, where the two main influences on Jobs were Apple and Kobun. By the early 1977, she and Jobs would spend time together at her home at Duveneck Ranch in Los Altos, which served as a hostel and environmental education center. Brennan also worked there as a teacher for inner city children who came to learn about the farm.

As Jobs and Apple became more successful, his relationship with Brennan grew more complex. In 1977 Brennan, Daniel Kottke, and Jobs moved into a house near the Apple office in Cupertino. Brennan notes that Jobs wanted the three of them to live together because, "Steve told me that he didn't want to get a house with just the two of us because it felt insufficient to him. Steve wanted his buddy Daniel to live with him because he believed it would break up the intensity of what wasn't working between us. Our relationship was running hot and cold. We were completely crazy about each other and utterly bored in turns. I had suggested to Steve that we separate, but he told me that he just couldn't bring himself to say good-bye." In addition, Jobs initially suggested that all three of them each have separate rooms. They were still involved with each other, but even then Brennan states that in her memory of the time, "I recalled how awful he was becoming and how I was starting to flounder." When she moved into the house, she had initially planned to commit to becoming an artist. However, she also needed to find work and eventually took a position at Apple in the Shipping Department (where she was part of a team that tested, assembled, and shipped Apple IIs with Mark Johnson and Bob Martinengo whom she enjoyed working with). She also took art classes at nearby De Anza College.

Brennan's relationship with Jobs was deteriorating as his position with Apple grew and she began to consider ending the relationship. In October 1977, Brennan was approached by Apple employee #5, Rod Holt, who asked her to take "a paid apprenticeship designing blueprints for the Apples." Both Holt and Jobs felt that it would be a good position for her, given her artistic abilities. Brennan's decision, however, was overshadowed by the fact that she realized she was pregnant and that Jobs was the father. It took her a few days to tell Jobs, whose face, according to Brennan "turned ugly" at the news.  According to Brennan, at the beginning of her third trimester, Jobs said to her: "I never wanted to ask that you get an abortion. I just didn't want to do that." He also refused to discuss the pregnancy with her. Brennan, herself, felt confused about what to do. She was estranged from her mother and afraid to discuss the matter with her father. She also did not feel comfortable with the idea of having an abortion. She chose instead to discuss the matter with Kobun, who encouraged her to have and keep the baby as he would lend his support. Meanwhile, Holt was waiting for her decision on the internship. Brennan states that Jobs continued to encourage her to take the internship, stating that she could "be pregnant and work at Apple, you can take the job. I don't get what the problem is." Brennan however notes that she "felt so ashamed: the thought of my growing belly in the professional environment at Apple, with the child being his, while he was unpredictable, in turn being punishing and sentimentally ridiculous. I could not have endured it." Brennan thus turned down the internship and decided to leave Apple. She states that Jobs told her "If you give up this baby for adoption, you will be sorry" and "I am never going to help you."

Lisa Brennan-Jobs
Now alone, Brennan was on welfare and cleaning houses to earn money. She would sometimes ask Jobs for money but he always refused. Brennan hid her pregnancy for as long as she could, living in a variety of homes, and continuing her work with Zen meditation. At the same time, according to Brennan, Jobs "started to seed people with the notion that I slept around and he was infertile, which meant that this could not be his child." A few weeks before she was due, Brennan was invited to have her baby at the All One Farm in Oregon and Brennan accepted the offer.

At the age of 23, Brennan gave birth to her daughter, Lisa Brennan, on May 17, 1978. Jobs did not attend the birth. He eventually visited after he was contacted by Robert Friedland, their mutual friend and owner of the All One Farm. While distant, Jobs worked with Brennan on a name for the baby. She suggested the name "Lisa" and says that Jobs was very attached to the name "Lisa" while he "was also publicly denying paternity." She would discover later that Jobs was preparing to unveil a new kind of computer that he wanted to give a female name. She states that she never gave him permission to use the baby's name for a computer and he hid the plans from her. Jobs also worked with his team to come up with the phrase, "Local Integrated System Architecture" as an alternative explanation for the Apple Lisa (decades later, however, Jobs admitted to his biographer Walter Isaacson that "obviously, it was named for my daughter").

Brennan explored adoption both before and after Lisa's birth but ultimately decided to become a single parent. Once, while staying with friends in the Bay Area, Jobs stopped by to see her. Brennan states that they went for a walk when Jobs said to her, "I am really sorry. I'll be back, this thing with Apple will be over when I'm about thirty. I am really, really sorry." Around the same time, she met with Kobun who distanced himself from her and did not fulfill his promise to help her once the baby was born.

Brennan would come under intense criticism from Jobs, who claimed that "she doesn't want money, she just wants me." According to Brennan, Apple's Mike Scott wanted Jobs to give her money, while other Apple executives "advised him to ignore me or fight if I tried to go after a paternity settlement." Brennan also notes that later, after Jobs was forced out of Apple, "he apologized many times over for this behavior. He said that he never took responsibility when he should have and that he was sorry." By this time, Jobs had developed a strong relationship with Lisa, who wanted her name changed and Jobs agreed. So he had her name on her birth certificate changed from Lisa Brennan to Lisa Brennan-Jobs.

When Lisa was a baby and Jobs continued to deny paternity, a DNA paternity test was given that established him as Lisa's father. He was required to give Brennan $385 a month and return the money she had received from welfare. Jobs gave her $500 a month at the time when Apple went public, and Jobs became a millionaire. Brennan worked as a waitress in Palo Alto. Later, Brennan agreed to give an interview with Michael Moritz for Time magazine. It would be for its 1982 Person of the Year special (released on January 3, 1983). She decided to be honest about her relationship with Jobs. The Time magazine issue had a lifelong impact on Brennan. Rather than give Jobs the "Person of the Year" award, Time offered the award of "Machine of the Year: The Computer Moves In". In the issue, Jobs questioned the reliability of the paternity test (which stated that the "probability of paternity for Jobs, Steven ... is 94.1%"). Jobs responded by arguing that "28% of the male population of the United States could be the father." Time also noted that "the baby girl and the machine on which Apple has placed so much hope for the future share the same name: Lisa." After this issue, Brennan "didn't pay much attention to Steve's career again."

Over the years, however, Brennan and Jobs developed a working relationship to co-parent Lisa, particularly after he was forced out of Apple. Brennan credits the change in him to the influence of his newly found biological sister, Mona Simpson, who worked to repair the relationship between Lisa and Jobs.

According to Fortune, Brennan wrote a letter to Jobs in 2005, and another in 2009, in which she said she would abandon writing her memoirs if Jobs would supply her with financial compensation of US$28 million for the suffering she went through as a single mother.

Painter
During the late 1980s, Brennan decided to finish her formal education and began to study at the California College of Arts and Crafts (where she was able to transfer her units from Foothill College). She asked Jobs to pay her tuition. He agreed to this request and according to Brennan was quite happy to do so, as part of his developing relationship with Lisa. In 1989, she transferred to the San Francisco Art Institute.

Brennan has lived in Monterey, California, while working as a professional painter. She describes her art as "light encoded paintings" and works mostly on commission for either private or corporate parties. She has also created murals for the Ronald McDonald House, Los Angeles County Hospital, Massachusetts General Hospital in Boston, and Packard Children's Hospital. Brennan stated that painting is "a language for me. Letters are form, and paintings are documents for information. When I mix those two, I'm happy. It gets me out of the normal way, which is what I want to do."

Works
 Brennan, Chrisann. The Bite in the Apple. New York: St. Martin's Press, 2013.
  The Brennan piece is a sidebar (Scroll down the page) of the main article: "The Steve Jobs Nobody Knew"

Portrayals
Brennan was portrayed by Gema Zamprogna in Pirates of Silicon Valley, by Ahna O'Reilly in Jobs and by Katherine Waterston in Steve Jobs.

References

1954 births
20th-century American women artists
21st-century American women artists
American essayists
American women essayists
American women painters
American Zen Buddhists
Apple Inc. employees
Artists from the San Francisco Bay Area
California College of the Arts alumni
Culture of the Pacific Northwest
Writers with dyslexia
Family of Steve Jobs
Foothill College alumni
Living people
People from Sunnyvale, California
San Francisco Art Institute alumni
Painters from California